The 1825 Vermont gubernatorial election took place in September and October, and resulted in the election of Cornelius P. Van Ness to a one-year term as governor.

The Vermont General Assembly met in Montpelier on October 13. The Vermont House of Representatives appointed a committee to review the votes of the freemen of Vermont for governor, lieutenant governor, treasurer, and members of the governor's council. Democratic-Republican Cornelius P. Van Ness was the only candidate. The committee determined that Van Ness had easily won a third one-year term. 

In the election for lieutenant governor, the committee determined that Democratic-Republican Aaron Leland was unopposed and had won election to a fourth one-year term.

Benjamin Swan was unopposed for election to a one-year term as treasurer, his twenty-sixth. Though he had nominally been a Federalist, Swan was usually endorsed by the Democratic-Republicans and even after the demise of the Federalist Party he was frequently unopposed.

In the races for governor, lieutenant governor, and treasurer, the results of the popular vote were not recorded by the General Assembly and were not reported in the news. Contemporary newspaper accounts indicated that Van Ness, Leland, and Swan had won their races "nearly unanimously".

Results

References

Vermont gubernatorial elections
gubernatorial
Vermont